Kenneth Bilby may refer to:
 Kenneth W. Bilby (1918–1997), executive vice president of RCA
 Kenneth M. Bilby (born 1953), American anthropologist, ethnomusicologist, and author